Radio Bemba Sound System is a live album by Manu Chao that was released in 2002. It is the accompanying CD to the performer's live DVD Babylonia en Guagua, filmed over two nights (4–5 September) in 2001 during the tour for Proxima Estacion: Esperanza. Many of the songs found on Radio Bemba Sound System, such as "Machine Gun", "Peligro","Mala Vida","King Kong Five" and "The Monkey", are songs originally recorded by Manu Chao's previous band, Mano Negra.  However the arrangements performed with Radio Bemba Sound System are more reggae-, ska-, and rock-oriented. The album is sequenced and edited in such a way that there is very little audience noise and cheering between the tracks, thus giving the impression of an all-night happy party - which calms down in the penultimate track ("Minha Galera") only to explode again in the last one ("Promiscuity"); the cheering at the end of "Promiscuity" is cut short by a very early fade.

Track listing
 "Intro" – 0:50
 "Bienvenida a Tijuana" – 01:55
 "Machine Gun" – 02:13
 "Por Dónde Saldrá el Sol?" – 02:41
 "Peligro" – 03:09
 "Welcome to Tijuana" – 02:50
 "El Viento" – 02:41
 "Casa Babylon" – 02:34
 "Por el Suelo" – 03:55
 "Blood and Fire" – 02:35
 "EZLN... Para Tod@s Todo..." – 01:41
 "Mr. Bobby" – 03:36
 "Bongo Bong" – 01:05
 "Radio Bemba" – 00:20
 "Qué Pasó Qué Pasó" – 00:54
 "Pinocchio (Viaggio In Groppa Al Tonno)" – 00:45
 "Cahí en la Trampa" – 02:10
 "Clandestino" – 02:59
 "Rumba de Barcelona" – 03:31
 "La Despedida" – 04:02
 "Mala Vida" – 02:26
 "Radio Bemba" – 00:34
 "Qué Pasó Qué Pasó" – 01:10
 "Pinocchio (Viaggio In Groppa Al Tonno)" – 00:45
 "La Primavera" – 03:32
 "The Monkey" – 01:59
 "King Kong Five" – 02:44
 "Minha Galera" – 03:17
 "Promiscuity" – 01:44

Personnel
Radio Bemba Sound System is also the name of Manu Chao's backing band, named for the communication system used in the Sierra Maestra by the Castro-and-Guevara-led rebels in the Cuban Revolution.

Vocals and rhythm guitar – Manu Chao
Lead guitar – Madjid Fahem
Bass guitar – Jean Michel Dercourt a.k.a. Gambeat
Drum kit – David Bourgnion
Percussion – Gerard Casajus Gaita
Keyboards – Julio García Lobos
Vocals – Bidji a.k.a. Lyricson
Trumpet – Roy Paci
Trombone – Gianny Salazar Camacho
Accordion – B-Roy

Charts

Weekly charts

Year-end charts

Certifications

References

Manu Chao albums
2002 live albums
Virgin Records live albums